Alexander Alekseevich Sukhanov (25 May 1952) is a Soviet and Russian poet, composer,  bard and mathematician who created more than two hundred songs.

Biography 
Alexander Sukhanov was born May 25, 1952, in Saratov, Russia, USSR.  During childhood he studied music, graduating from music school as a violin major.  In 1974 Sukhanov earned an undergraduate degree (with honors) from the Mechanics and Mathematics Department of Moscow State University.  He later earned a Ph.D. in Mathematics from the same institution.  He taught mathematics at Gagarin Air Force Academy; since 1981 he has worked at the computational methods laboratory at MSU.

In 1969 Sukhanov began writing music to his own lyrics, as well as to the poetry of Samuil Marshak, Iosif Utkin, Percy Shelley, Alexander Vertinsky, Alexander Pushkin, Nikolai Rubtsov, and others.  He gained wide success as a performer of his songs at concerts and festivals.  Sukhanov composed scores for several plays, released a Melodia record as well several CD albums.

Selected discography
Green Carriage, 1996
Oh, you're my cart ..., 1998
Romance of old age, 2000
Snowdrops of tenderness, Disk 2, Disk 1, 2002
Selected songs

References

Links 
 Home Page
 Interview with Sukhanov by Natella Boltyanskaya at Echo of Moscow
 Selected lyrics (Russian)
 His page at Russian Bard Resource page
 Catalog of soundtracks of his songs

1952 births
Living people
Russian bards
Writers from Saratov
Russian male poets
Soviet poets
Soviet male writers
20th-century Russian male writers
Scientists from Saratov
Soviet songwriters
Musicians from Saratov